Events from the year 1788 in Poland

Incumbents
 Monarch – Stanisław II August

Events

 
 - Great Sejm

Births

Deaths

References

 
Years of the 18th century in Poland